Esperanto is an international auxiliary language.

Esperanto may also refer to:

Magazines
 Esperanto (magazine)
 Esperanto (student magazine), the student magazine of Monash University's Caulfield campus

Music
 Esperanto (Elektric Music album), an album by Karl Bartos under the pseudonym Elektric Music
 Esperanto (Shadowfax album)
 Esperanto, a 1985 album by Ryuichi Sakamoto
 "Esperanto", a song by Shawn Lane from Powers of Ten
 "Esperanto", the third studio album by Mexican pop group, Kabah

Other
 1421 Esperanto, a main-belt asteroid
 Esperanto Island
 Esperanto Filmoj, an American film and television production company
 Esperanto (schooner), a 1906 fishing schooner
 Mark Esper, US Secretary of Defense